Complement component 3, often simply called C3, is a protein of the immune system. It plays a central role in the complement system and contributes to innate immunity. In humans it is encoded on chromosome 19 by a gene called C3.

Function 
C3 plays a central role in the activation of the complement system. Its activation is required for both classical and alternative complement activation pathways. People with C3 deficiency are susceptible to bacterial infection.

One form of C3-convertase, also known as C4b2a, is formed by a heterodimer of activated forms of C4 and C2. It catalyzes the proteolytic cleavage of C3 into C3a and C3b, generated during activation through the classical pathway as well as the lectin pathway. C3a is an anaphylotoxin and the precursor of some cytokines such as ASP, and C3b serves as an opsonizing agent. Factor I can cleave C3b into C3c and C3d, the latter of which plays a role in enhancing B cell responses. In the alternative complement pathway, C3 is cleaved by C3bBb, another form of C3-convertase composed of activated forms of C3 (C3b) and factor B (Bb). Once C3 is activated to C3b, it exposes a reactive thioester that allows the peptide to covalently attach to any surface that can provide a nucleophile such as a primary amine or a hydroxyl group. Activated C3 can then interact with factor B. Factor B is then activated by factor D, to form Bb. The resultant complex, C3bBb, is called the alternative pathway (AP) C3 convertase.

C3bBb is deactivated in steps. First, the proteolytic component of the convertase, Bb, is removed by complement regulatory proteins having decay-accelerating factor (DAF) activity. Next, C3b is broken down progressively to first iC3b, then C3c + C3dg, and then finally C3d. Factor I is the protease cleaves C3b but requires a cofactor (e.g Factor H, CR1, MCP or C4BP) for activity.

Structure 
Several crystallographic structures of C3 have been determined and reveal that this protein contains 13 domains.

The C3 precursor protein is first processed by the removal of 4 Arginine residues, forming two chains, beta and alpha, linked by a disulfide bond. The C3 convertase activates C3 by cleaving the alpha chain, releasing C3a anaphylatoxin and generating C3b (beta chain + alpha' (alpha prime) chain).

Biochemistry

Biosynthesis 
In humans, C3 is predominantly synthesised by liver hepatocytes and to some degree by epidermis keratinocytes.

Clinical use 

Levels of C3 in the blood may be measured to support or refute a particular medical diagnosis. For example, low C3 levels are associated with Systemic Lupus Erythematosus (SLE)
and some types of kidney disease such as post-infectious glomerulonephritis, membranoproliferative glomerulonephritis, and shunt nephritis. 
.c3 may be lost in urine in nephrotic syndrome

Interactions 

Complement component 3 has been shown to interact with Factor H.

Pathology
Deficiencies in C3 lead to genetic infections, usually fatal to the newborn.

References

Further reading

External links 
  GeneReviews/NCBI/NIH/UW entry on Atypical Hemolytic-Uremic Syndrome
  OMIM entries on Atypical Hemolytic-Uremic Syndrome
  GeneReviews/NCBI/NIH/UW entry on Dense Deposit Disease/Membranoproliferative Glomerulonephritis Type II
 
 

Complement system